Kanipe may refer to:
 84447 Jeffkanipe, a main-belt asteroid named after Jeff Kanipe
 Jeff Kanipe (born 1953), an American science writer